Moscow Narodny Bank  is a Russian bank. It was established under the Articles of Association approved by the Ministry of Finance on March 3, 1911 (published in the Collection of Edicts and Executive Orders of the Government of Russia on September 29, 1911). It was opened in Moscow on May 9, 1912.

History 
The idea of setting up such a bank occurred at the First All-Russian Convention of Representatives of Cooperative Establishments in 1908 and was endorsed afterwards by annual conventions of cooperators. The purpose of setting-up and operation of the Moscow Narodny Bank was: “to deliver monetary funds to small loan institutions and all kinds of cooperative enterprises in order to ease their turnovers”.

The governing body of the Bank was determined by the Board, which was located in Moscow, the controlling body was the council. The Bank's fixed capital at its establishment was 1 million rubles, divided into 4,000 shares with a par value of 250 rubles.

The founders were: a prominent figure in the cooperative movement N. P. Gibner, chairman of the committee of rural savings partnerships, nobleman V. A. Pereleshin, agronomist P. A. Sadyrin, agronomist V. I. Anisimov, a peasant deputy of the State Duma of the 1st convocation from the Moscow province A. P. Pavlov, state councilors E. D. Maksimov, A. V. Vasiliev, I. P. Grundsky, peasant A. P. Pavlov. N. P. Gibner became the first chairman of the board, A. V. Pereleshin became the chairman of the board, and the merchant A. N. Balakshin, A. N. Antsyferov and T. I. Buynov became deputies.

The original building of the bank was located at Myasnitskaya Street in Moscow. Since 1912 Moscow Narodny Bank has become a major mortgage lending facilitator in Russia and has been at the head of the small loan institution system.

The bank was managed in accordance with the principles of cooperation. In accordance with the charter, the Council of the Bank was to consist of representatives of cooperatives by 2/3. In the general meeting, shareholders could not have more than 5 votes, regardless of the number of shares.

The Moscow Narodny Bank entered into an agreement with the Moscow Union of Consumer Societies, according to which the bank purchased fertilizers, agricultural machinery and seeds. The Bank participated in the creation of cooperative associations engaged in the purchase and sale of various goods.

Moscow Narodny Bank had 12 branches, agencies and commission offices in different towns and cities of European Russia, Siberia, Far East and Caucasus, including Petrograd, Vladivostok, Perm, Tiflis (Tbilisi), Irkutsk, Samarkand, Tashkent and Bukhara.

Bank agencies were established in London (1915) and New York City (1916). In 1916 the London agency was reorganized into a fully valid subsidiary.

By 1917, the bank's own funds amounted to 4 million rubles.

Reorganization

The Moscow Narodny Bank was declared state property on the basis of the Decree of the All-Russian Central Executive Committee of December 14, 1917, on the nationalization of banks. By the Decree of the People's Commissariat of Finance of December 2, 1918, the Moscow Narodny Bank was nationalized with its transformation into a special cooperative department of the People's Bank of the RSFSR. On October 18, 1919, the London subsidiary was reorganized into an independent bank Moscow Narodny Bank Limited acting in accordance with English Law. Moscow Narodny Bank was announced to be in public ownership under the decree of the All-Russian Central Executive Committee of December 14, 1917, on bank nationalization.

Nationalization of Moscow Narodny Bank was executed by the Executive Order of the People's Finance Committee of December 2, 1918, whereupon the bank was reorganized into a special cooperative department of the Narodny Bank of the Russian Soviet Federative Socialist Republic.

References

Further reading 
 

Defunct banks of Russia
Banks of the Soviet Union
Companies based in Moscow